David Joshua Azrieli,  (10 May 1922 – 9 July 2014) was an Israeli-Canadian real estate tycoon, developer,  designer, architect, and philanthropist. With an estimated net worth of US$3.1 billion as of March 2013, Azrieli was ranked by Forbes as the ninth wealthiest Canadian and 401st in the world.

Azrieli established the Azrieli Foundation in 1989, and on his passing, bequeathed the bulk of his estate to the Foundation.

Biography
David Azrieli was born in 1922 into a Jewish family in Maków Mazowiecki, Poland. He fled Poland for the USSR early in World War II and eventually made it to British Mandate Palestine in late 1942. He was smuggled along with a shipment of arms. Except for Azrieli and a brother, his entire family perished during the Holocaust.

Between 1943 and 1946, Azrieli studied architecture at Technion-Israel Institute of Technology, but did not complete his studies at that time. He fought in the 1948 Arab-Israeli War. In 1954, he immigrated to Montreal, Quebec.

He completed a Bachelor of Arts at the Thomas More Institute in Montreal (now part of Bishop's University) in 1956. At the age of 75, he earned a Master of Architecture degree from Carleton University.

In 1957, he married Stephanie Lefcort. They have four children: Rafael, Sharon, Naomi and Danna. For the last 10 years of his life, Azrieli and his wife resided in Herzliya, Israel, for five months per year, and in Westmount, Quebec for the rest of the year. He died on 9 July 2014 at his lake house in Ivry-sur-le-Lac, Quebec, aged 92.

Business career
In Montreal, he established his building business, beginning with the construction of small duplexes and working his way up to apartment buildings and, later on, shopping malls. Azrieli's building projects can be seen in the office buildings, high-rise residences, office towers and shopping centres he built in Canada, the United States and Israel. His two companies are Montreal-based Canpro Investments Ltd. and Tel Aviv-based Azrieli Group Ltd.

In 2010, he took the Azrieli Group public in the largest ever IPO on the Tel Aviv Stock Exchange. It is now the largest real estate company in the country. Its projects include a number of Israeli commercial centres, including the first enclosed mall in Israel – the Canion Ayalon in Ramat Gan –  as well as the Jerusalem Shopping Mall (Canion Yerushalayim) in Malha, Jerusalem, the Beer Sheva Shopping Mall (Canion ha-Negev), Beersheba. He also built the eponymous Azrieli Center in Tel Aviv, the largest real estate project in Israel, which includes three skyscrapers in the heart of Tel Aviv and has become an architectural landmark at the core of Israel's business activities.

Philanthropy

The Azrieli Foundation was established by David Azrieli in 1989 to support initiatives and develop and operate programs that promote access to education and the achievement of excellence in various fields of knowledge and activity.

Azrieli’s early philanthropy established the Azrieli Graduate School of Jewish Education and Administration at Yeshiva University in New York City and supported schools and educational institutions in Canada and Israel. His aim to support education in multiple and diverse ways guides the Azrieli Foundation to this day. The Foundation has disbursed over CAD $450 million since 1989. Notable donations in that time include: the Azrieli Schools of Architecture at Tel Aviv University and Carleton University; the Azrieli Faculty of Medicine at Bar Ilan University, the creation of the Azrieli Institute for Educational Empowerment, Azrieli Institute for Systems Biology at Weizmann Institute of Science, Azrieli Institute of Israel Studies at Concordia University, and the School of Continuing Studies at Technion-Israel Institute of Technology.

In 2020 the Azrieli Foundation created an emergency fund to be allocated to meet urgent needs caused by the COVID-19 pandemic. As of 1 October 2020, the Foundation pledged CAD $8.6 million for pandemic-related initiatives, including food relief, hospitals and long-term care institutions and support for the vulnerable including Holocaust survivors, people with disabilities, people experiencing homelessness, and students.

Controversy

Van Horne Mansion

In 1969, the heirs of Canadian railway magnate William Cornelius Van Horne put up for sale the Van Horne Mansion in Montreal, Quebec, Canada. A buyer was not found until 1973, when developer David Azrieli bought the land. His intention to raze the mansion was met with fierce opposition from many groups opposed to the demolition spree of the Golden Square Mile, including Rene Lepine, another big-time real estate developer who owned the building next to the Van Horne Mansion and who wanted to buy it back from Azrieli to restore the mansion instead of developing the land. However, Azrieli remained committed to demolishing the historic landmark and did so on 8 September 1973. The Sofitel Montreal now stands on the property which is the building Azrieli built.

As a direct result of this action, the group Save Montreal was formed to organize resistance to future demolitions.

Im Tirtzu movement
The Israeli newspaper Haaretz reported that "What you won’t find on either the [Azrieli] foundation’s or company’s websites is that in 2010 the Azrieli Group apparently donated NIS 30,000 (CAD $10,000) to Im Tirtzu" even though the Azrieli group "claims it has no political agenda."  The donation was made specifically "to a project to stop the academic boycott of Israel."

Awards and recognition
Member of the Order of Canada (1984)
Chevalier to the Ordre national du Quebec (1999)
Honorary doctorate from Concordia University (1975), Yeshiva University (1983), Technion-Israel Institute of Technology (1985), Tel Aviv University (1996), Carleton University (2003), Weizmann Institute of Science (2012)
Israeli Prime Minister’s Jubilee Award (1998)
Honorary Fellow of the City of Jerusalem (2001)
Queen Elizabeth II’s Golden Jubilee Medal (2002)
Queen Elizabeth II’s Diamond Jubilee Medal (2012)

Published works
 Azrieli, Danna J.: One step ahead : David J. Azrieli (Azrylewicz) : memoirs 1939-1950. Yad Vashem, Jerusalem 2001.

See also
Economy of Israel

References

External links
 CONCERT TO HONOUR AZRIELI ON HIS 85TH
 Pour une mémoire vive
 Azrieli Foundation launches series of Holocaust memoirs

1922 births
2014 deaths
Architects from Montreal
Businesspeople from Montreal
Canadian architects
Canadian billionaires
Jewish Canadian philanthropists
Canadian people of Polish-Jewish descent
Carleton University alumni
Israeli architects
Israeli billionaires
Israeli businesspeople
Israeli Jews
Knights of the National Order of Quebec
Members of the Order of Canada
People from Maków County
Polish emigrants to Canada
Yeshiva University